Kuh Sefid or Kuh-e Sefid or Kooh Sefid or Kuhsafid (meaning "white mountain") may refer to:

Kuh Sefid, Fars
Kuh Sefid, Hormozgan
Kuh Sefid, Kerman
Kuh-e Sefid, Markazi
Kuh Sefid, Qom
Kuh-e Sefid, Razavi Khorasan
Kuh Sefid-e Sofla, Razavi Khorasan Province
Kuh Sefid, Sistan and Baluchestan
Kuh Sefid Rural District, Sistan and Baluchestan Province

See also
Sefid Kuh (disambiguation)